The Seattle Freeze is, according to widely held belief, a difficulty with making new friends  in the U.S. city of Seattle, Washington, particularly for transplants from other areas. A 2005 article in The Seattle Times appears to be the first known use of the term, although the phenomenon was documented during rapid population increases in the early 1920s, World War II, and the 1980s.

Key traits 
Newcomers to the area have described Seattleites as socioculturally apathetic, standoffish, cold, distant, and distrustful. People from Seattle tend to mainly interact with their particular clique in social settings such as bars and parties. One author described the aversion to strangers as "people [who] are very polite but not particularly friendly", while some residents dispute any existence of the Seattle Freeze altogether.

History 
Speculation of the origin is the reserved personalities of the city's early Nordic and Asian immigrants, the emotional effects of the climate (such as Seasonal Affective Disorder), or the region's history of independent-minded pioneers.

The Seattle Times reported in April 1920: “Seattle people have been accused of being too cold and distant.” The Seattle Daily Times described similar characteristics as early as the 1940s. Seattle experienced an influx of new residents from California beginning in the 1980s, and a 2005 article in The Seattle Times appears to be the first known use of the term.

A 2008 peer-reviewed study published in Perspectives on Psychological Science found that among all 50 states, Washington residents ranked 48th in the personality trait extraversion.  In 2014, a report by a local nonprofit organization ranked the population 48th out of 50 similarly sized cities in "talking with neighbors frequently", and 37th for "giving or receiving favors". The rapid growth of Amazon and its accompanying influx of technology workers who could be considered more introverted than other working professionals may have exacerbated the issue. A 2019 nonscientific poll conducted by Seattle-based PEMCO Insurance found that about 40% of the 1,200 respondents in Washington and Oregon said making new friends was not important. In similar 2022 poll, about two-thirds of residents agreed, at least somewhat, that giving newcomers the "cold shoulder" was a typical trait from those in the Pacific Northwest.

The Seattle Freeze was discussed in relation to isolation during the COVID-19 pandemic spurred lockdowns due to the region's already engrained propensity for "cultural distancing", along with the Director of the University of Washington's Center for the Science of Social Connection describing it as "you feel outside the group but the group itself is intact".

See also

 Iowa nice
 Minnesota nice
 Seattle process
 Southern hospitality

References

Culture of Seattle
Social phenomena
Culture of the Pacific Northwest
Social issues